Bataveh-ye Najak (also Romanized as Bātāveh-ye Nājak) is a village in Tayebi-ye Sarhadi-ye Sharqi Rural District, Charusa District, Kohgiluyeh County, Kohgiluyeh and Boyer-Ahmad Province, Iran. In a 2006 census, its population was 109, in 18 families.

References 

Populated places in Kohgiluyeh County